Oakleigh may refer to:

Places

Australia 
Oakleigh, Potts Point, a heritage-listed house in Sydney, New South Wales
Oakleigh, Victoria, suburb of Melbourne, Australia
 Oakleigh railway station
 Oakleigh Grammar, a school
City of Oakleigh, Victoria, Australia; a former LGA
Electoral district of Oakleigh, an electoral district in Victoria, Australia
 Mount Oakleigh, Tasmania

New Zealand 
Oakleigh, New Zealand, locality in the North Island

United Kingdom 
Oakleigh, Glencrutchery Road, Douglas, Isle of Man, one of Isle of Man's Registered Buildings
Oakleigh Park, Barnet, London, England; a northern suburb in Greater London
 Oakleigh Park railway station
 Oakleigh Park Tunnel
Oakleigh Way, Micham, Merton, London, England

United States 
 Oakleigh Garden Historic District, Mobile, Alabama
 Oakleigh Historic Complex (Mobile, Alabama), historic complex in Mobile, Alabama
 Oakleigh (Holly Springs, Mississippi), a historic mansion in Holly Springs, Mississippi

People
 Oakleigh Thorne (1866−1948),  U.S. businessman

Fictional characters
 Lord Evelyn Oakleigh, a fictional character from Anything Goes

Sports
 Oakleigh Football Club, Oakleigh, Victoria, Australia; a VFA team
 Oakleigh District Football Club, Victoria, Australia; a SFNL team
 Oakleigh Plate, Australian horse race

Other uses
 Oakleigh House School, Swansea, Wales, UK

See also

New Oakleigh Mine, Moreton, Queensland, Australia
Oakleigh East, Victoria, Australia
Oakleigh Racecourse railway station, Springvale, Melbourne, Victoria, Australia
South Oakleigh Secondary College, Victoria, Australia
 
Oakeley (disambiguation)
Oakley (disambiguation)